Sio (also spelled Siâ) is an Austronesian language spoken by about 3,500 people on the north coast of the Huon Peninsula in Morobe Province, Papua New Guinea. According to Harding and Clark (1994), Sio speakers lived in a single village on a small offshore island until the Pacific War, after which they established four villages on the nearby coast: Lambutina, Basakalo, Laelo, and Balambu. Nambariwa, another coastal village a few miles to the east, is also Sio-speaking.

Michael Stolz (died 1931) of the German Lutheran Neuendettelsauer Mission arrived in 1910, and Sio villagers converted en masse in 1919. "Since then the Sio have produced many Lutheran evangelists, lay mission workers, teachers, and churchmen" (Harding and Clark 1994: 31). However, the Sio villages were assigned to the mostly Papuan Kâte language circuit, rather than to the mostly Austronesian Jabêm language circuit. Stolz was the principal translator, although many of the hymns were composed by native speakers of Sio, and the whole volume was edited by L. Wagner, Stolz's successor.

Phonology

Vowels (orthographic)
The low back vowel is pronounced . All vowels vary in length, but length is rarely contrastive. Monosyllabic nouns and adjectives tend to be lengthened more than monosyllabic verbs, adverbs, or prepositions. Word stress generally falls on the penultimate syllable.

Consonants (current orthography)
When Stephen and Dawn Clark of SIL International began to work with Sio speakers in 1985, the latter expressed a desire to revise their orthography to make it more similar to what people had become familiar with in Tok Pisin and English. The eventual results are tabulated in the following chart. The community at first resisted writing the labialized consonants as digraphs, since they clearly regarded them as unit phonemes. They insisted on writing the labialization as superscripts rather than as separate segments. However, by 1992, after many materials were produced in the new orthography, Sio teachers and church circuit officers approved writing the indicator of labialization on the same line, thus accepting mw instead of mʷ (Clark 1993).

Consonants (original orthography)
The first orthography of Sio was devised by the missionary Michael Stolz, based on that of the Kâte language, which the German Lutheran mission used as a church and school lingua franca among speakers of Papuan languages. (Sio appears to have been assigned to the wrong language circuit.) The linguist Otto Dempwolff served as mentor and adviser to all the German missionaries in New Guinea on language questions. After Stolz died, Dempwolff analyzed his language materials and compiled a short sketch (1936). His analysis differs in several key respects from that of Clark (1993), who has had firsthand experience with the language. But Clark also found that g-  and -c-  were positional variants of the same phoneme; that trilled  is just a conditioned variant of flapped ; and that the approximants are conditioned variants of their corresponding vowels.

Morphology

Pronouns

Free pronouns

References

 Clark, Dawn S. (1993). "The phonology of the Sio language." In John M. Clifton (ed.), Phonologies of Austronesian languages 2, 25-70. Data Papers on Papua New Guinea Languages, 40. Ukarumpa: Summer Institute of Linguistics.
 Dempwolff, Otto (1936). Bemerkungen über die Siâ-Sprache. Zu den Aufzeichnungen von Missionar Michael Stolz. (Copied out by L. Wagner, 15/7/1936.) Ms. 13 pp.
 Harding, Thomas G., and Stephen A. Clark (1994). The Sio story of Male. Pacific Studies 17, no. 4, 29-51.
 Stolz, M., trans.; Wagner, H., ed. (1953). Miti Kanaŋo: Siŋga Wa Waseki Wa. Madang: Lutheran Mission Press.

External links
 Paradisec has two collections of Arthur Cappell's materials (AC1, AC2) and one collection of Malcolm Ross's materials (MR1) that include Sio language materials.
 The New Testament and Psalms in the Sio Language of Papua New Guinea

Ngero–Vitiaz languages
Languages of Morobe Province